Sara Zandieh is an Iranian American filmmaker whose film, The Pool Party, won second place at the Tribeca Film Festival. It received a Special Jury Mention. Zandieh is a Fulbright Scholar at Columbia University.

Works
In 2009, Sara Zandieh entered a story called The Pool Party in the Narrative Magazine 30 Below contest for writers between the ages of 18 to 30. She was among the top ten N30B finalists and won $100 for her effort.

In 2010, Zandieh directed The Pool Party. It is a 14-minute short film that was shot in Tehran just prior to the 2009-2010 Iranian election crisis. It documents the story of a male servant, who must fully repair a pool, while acting as a surrogate father to the master's daughter. Zandieh combined social realism with allegory to illustrate the servant's struggle.

2010 Tribeca Film Festival
Zandieh's film was one of 47 short films screened in Lower Manhattan theaters. Like Tal Rosner, Zandieh is a returning director. Amongst other directors premiering films, she competed against Kirsten Dunst. Student kudos went to the winning short, Some Boys Don't Leave, "with special mention going to Sara Zandieh's The Pool Party."

On April 29, 2010, The Pool Party was shown at the Columbia University School of the Arts' 23rd Annual Film Festival.

Awards
Zandieh won a 2009-2010 grant from the Fulbright Program. This program is the "most widely recognized and prestigious international exchange program in the world." She is one of 40 Kentucky students chosen and listed with the United States Department of State as being a filmmaking student from Turkey.

Filmography

 Handsome Harry (2009)
 The Pool Party (2010)
 A Simple Wedding (2019)
 The Other Zoey (TBA)

References

External links
 
 The Pool Party Tribeca Film Festival, Retrieved: 2010-05-16.
 
 https://www.huffingtonpost.com/sara-zandieh

American people of Iranian descent
American women film directors
Living people
Year of birth missing (living people)
Columbia University School of the Arts alumni
21st-century American women